Cuba Cola is a cola-flavoured soft drink produced in Sweden, bottled by Saturnus AB. It was introduced to the market in the summer of 1953 soon after cola drinks had become legal in Sweden, beating Coca-Cola by three months in Sweden.

The recipe is owned by Saturnus AB of Malmö and it is brewed on license by Vasa bryggeri, Hammars bryggeri, Heines bryggeri, Guttsta Källa and Krönleins.

References

External links

Cola brands
Swedish drinks
1953 establishments in Sweden